Chris Langkow (born August 22, 1989) is a Canadian professional ice hockey center who is currently playing for HKM Zvolen of the Slovak Extraliga.

Playing career
Prior to turning professional, Langkow played major junior hockey in the Western Hockey League with the Spokane Chiefs, Saskatoon Blades, and the Everett Silvertips. During the 2012–13 season, Langkow was traded by the Reading Royals to the South Carolina Stingrays on November 9, 2012.

After playing the majority of the 2013–14 season with the Bridgeport Sound Tigers, posting 20 points in 64 games, Langkow was signed to a one-year extension on May 13, 2014. In his first full AHL season with Bridgeport in 2014–15, Langkow appeared in a career high 69 games with 8 goals and 16 points.

On August 7, 2015, Langkow returned to the ECHL as a free agent, agreeing to a one-year contract with the Elmira Jackals. Following the 2015–16 season, Langkow left North America after 6 professional seasons, agreeing to his first European contract with Slovenian club, HDD Olimpija Ljubljana of the EBEL on July 24, 2016.
Langkow compiled 10 goals and 28 points in 41 games with Ljubljana before leaving to join Swedish second division club, VIK Västerås HK of the HockeyAllsvenskan on January 20, 2017. He registered just 3 assists in 13 games before helping the club avoid relegation in the post-season.

Langkow returned to the ECHL as a free agent in the off-season, agreeing to a one-year deal with inaugural club, the Worcester Railers, on August 24, 2017. In the 2017–18 season, Langkow contributed offensively with 45 points in 50 games. He enjoyed a brief stint in the AHL with the Hartford Wolf Pack, notching a goal and assist in 7 games.

On June 29, 2018, Langkow returned to Europe as a free agent, securing a one-year deal with Hungarian club, MAC Budapest, for their inaugural season in the Slovak Extraliga.

Personal
Chris is a first cousin to NHL veteran Daymond and Scott Langkow.

Career statistics

Awards and honours

References

External links

1989 births
Living people
Alaska Aces (ECHL) players
Bridgeport Sound Tigers players
Canadian ice hockey centres
Elmira Jackals (ECHL) players
Everett Silvertips players
Hartford Wolf Pack players
HC Litvínov players
HKM Zvolen players
HC Nové Zámky players
HDD Olimpija Ljubljana players
Peoria Rivermen (AHL) players
Reading Royals players
Saskatoon Blades players
South Carolina Stingrays players
Spokane Chiefs players
Ice hockey people from Alberta
People from Vegreville
VIK Västerås HK players
Worcester Railers players
Canadian expatriate ice hockey players in Hungary
Canadian expatriate ice hockey players in the Czech Republic
Canadian expatriate ice hockey players in Slovenia
Canadian expatriate ice hockey players in Sweden
Canadian expatriate ice hockey players in the United States
Canadian expatriate ice hockey players in Slovakia